Prathi Gnayiru 9 Manimudhal 10.30 Varai is a 2006 Indian Tamil-language vendetta film. The film is a remake of the Hindi film Raja Ki Aayegi Baraat.

Plot 
Four carefree college students on holiday, Ramesh, Remo, Murugan and Seetharaman, mistake Kalyani for a call girl and rape her. Realising of their mistake, they hurriedly return to Chennai.

Ramesh is married off to a distant relative by his father. Only after the wedding, he discovers that his wife resembles Kalyani. This sends a chill down the spines of Ramesh's friends. A sequence of events lead to Kalyani taking revenge on the friends. Whether they realized their mistake and whether they are taken to task forms the rest of the storyline. In the end Kalyani fatally poisons Ramesh with chili smoke.

Cast 
 Suresh S. as Ramesh
 Poornitha as Kalyani
 Karunas as Remo
 'Super 10' Balaji
 Ravi
 Rekhasri
 Vaiyapuri as Police officer
 Delhi Ganesh as Ramesh's father
 Vennira Aadai Moorthy
 Kuyili as Kalyani's mother
 Singamuthu

Production
Kalyani Suresh, aged 15, was cast in the film.

Soundtrack

Reception
A critic from Indiaglitz opined that "Anbu has taken a serious theme and has laced it with glamour which sometimes takes the focus away from the movie. Nevertheless, the performance of the artistes call for appreciation and the director is to be lauded for the same". Malini Mannath of Chennai Online opined that "The film opens with the shot of a woman cutting a solitary figure on a hillock near the waters, as she looks out into the beyond. The film ends there too. A very aesthetically taken shot. Wish the rest of the film's sensibility matched with it!".

References

2006 films
2000s Tamil-language films
Tamil remakes of Hindi films